The Staatsarchiv Ludwigsburg (Ludwigsburg State Archives), located in Ludwigsburg, Germany, is a public institutional repository for roughly 680 state authorities within the District of Stuttgart, Germany.

Holdings 
The historical holdings come from the North Württemberg (de) area.  Notable holdings, unveiled through the process of denazification, include documents related to the holocaust (more than 500,000).

The archives also house the files of the Police Headquarters Stuttgart (de), the decorative folders and role books of the Staatstheater Stuttgart and all birth records of the Landesfrauenklinik Stuttgart (Stuttgart Women's State Hospital); the documents of the Teutonic Order, official books of the convent Ellwangen and documents of Ulm, Esslingen am Neckar, Heilbronn, and other former free imperial cities.  The collections also include personnel files of the Deutsche Reichsbahn (the German National Railway) and the Deutsche Bundesbahn (the German Federal Railway) from the Reichsbahndirektion/Bundesbahndirektion Stuttgart (de) (Federal Railway Directorate).

Facilities 
The Ludwigsburg State Archives relocated, in 1995, from a castle to the Arsenal Barracks and Armory located in the center of Ludwigsburg.
 The Arsenal Barracks (Arsenalkaserne) houses the public areas – including a reading room, an auditorium, an exhibition room, library, and an administration office
Both buildings were mechanically and structurally re-purposed to meet the safekeeping requirements of modern archives.  The buildings are connected by an underground corridor, through which a transport system delivers documents to researchers in the reading room.

Governmental oversight 

As part of the Baden-Württemberg administrative reorganization of 2005, Staatsarchiv Ludwigsburg has been a department of the newly created Landesarchiv Baden-Württemberg (de) (Baden-Württemberg State Archives), which was inaugurated January 1, 2005. Staatsarchiv Ludwigsburg is one of eight constituent departments of Landesarchiv Baden-Württemberg (de).  Six of the eight departments have an archival mission and two have a service mission.

Archive departments:
 Department 1: Staatsarchiv Freiburg (de)
 Department 2: Generallandesarchiv Karlsruhe (de)
 Department 3: Staatsarchiv Ludwigsburg with the branch, Hohenlohe-Zentralarchiv Neuenstein (de)
 Department 4: Staatsarchiv Sigmaringen (de)
 Department 5: Hauptstaatsarchiv Stuttgart (de)
 Department 6: Staatsarchiv Wertheim

Service departments
 Department 7: Central Services with Institute for the Preservation of Archives and Library Goods
 Department 8: Archival Principle with Land Registry (de) Central Archives of Kornwestheim

The Landesarchiv is a supreme state authority in the portfolio of the Ministry of Science, Research and Art in Baden-Wuerttemberg (de).

Gallery

See also 
 Stadtarchiv Stuttgart (de) (City Archives of Stuttgart)

Notes

References 

Archives in Germany
Records management
Special collections libraries
History of Stuttgart
Online archives